Andrew Merrill (born November 27, 1966)  is an American voice actor best known for his portrayal of the character Brak on Space Ghost Coast to Coast and Cartoon Planet.

Personal life 
Merrill is a graduate of Asbury University, where he majored in media communications. He and his wife, Stacy Isenhower who works for Cartoon Network, have one girl. In an Instagram post on October 25, 2022, Merrill indicated that he had "been a bachelor for nearly a year now," leading to speculation that he and his wife have separated.

Space Ghost Coast to Coast 
Merrill joined Cartoon Network within several months of its inception (in 1992), coming over from sister company CNN.  He started working in programming, and in 1993 he and then head of programming Mike Lazzo helped put together the first animated late-night talk show, Space Ghost Coast to Coast. He voiced Space Ghost in the first of two unaired pilots for the show.

In April 1994, Space Ghost Coast to Coast premiered on Cartoon Network. The concept was that 1960s Hanna-Barbera cartoon superhero Space Ghost had retired from being a superhero and was hosting his own talk show, in which he interviewed live action celebrity guests, with his old archenemies Zorak and Moltar as band leader and director. To date, the show has had over 90 episodes aired on television, and was one of the motivating forces behind the creation of the Adult Swim programming bracket started in 2001. Merrill helped produce and write for the show for years, and voiced "Council of Doom" members Brak and Lokar, who would appear on the show periodically, mostly Brak.

Merrill, along with Coast to Coast friend and co-star George Lowe, wrote on social media that their friend and co-star C. Martin Croker died on September 17, 2016. It was then revealed that Adult Swim would play the first produced episode of Space Ghost Coast to Coast aired 12:30 eastern, 11:30 central that night in honor of Croker's contribution not only to Space Ghost, but many Adult Swim shows in both animation and voice overs. The three of them, along with Dave Willis, Dana Snyder, and Carey Means had been friends since their earliest Cartoon Network days.

Cartoon Planet 
In 1995, Cartoon Planet premiered on TBS (moving to Cartoon Network in 1996). Merrill wrote and produced the show, along with crew members who had worked on Space Ghost Coast to Coast, himself voicing the character of Brak. The main characters on Cartoon Planet were Space Ghost, Zorak, and Brak, and it was a show of skits and songs put together with the same limited animation used in Space Ghost Coast to Coast.

Originally, the skits and songs were filler for showing old cartoons owned by Turner Entertainment (Hanna-Barbera, Looney Tunes, Merrie Melodies, Popeye the Sailor) until the skits and songs became more popular and Brak developed more of a personality and grew popular with fans. The show eventually became entirely skits and songs.

Brak spin-offs 
In 2000, two Sonny and Cher-style variety show specials premiered on Cartoon Network, titled Brak Presents the Brak Show Starring Brak. The show featured new animation, and new songs with celebrity guests and fellow Space Ghost villain Zorak. However, the specials were met with mixed reviews from fans. In the early hours of December 21, 2000, a new sitcom parody cartoon premiered, titled "Leave It to Brak", which was actually the pilot episode for the future Adult Swim show The Brak Show, which premiered on Adult Swim in 2001 and ran for three seasons.

Merill is also set to reprise Brak in an upcoming episode of HBO Max’s Jellystone!, which is also based on Hanna-Barbera characters.

Boomerang 
Merrill left Atlanta briefly, moving to New Jersey for a year and joining the programming department of Boomerang, an asset of the Turner Broadcasting System.

Acting

References

External links
 

1966 births
Living people
Asbury University alumni
American male video game actors
American male voice actors
Male actors from Columbus, Ohio
People from Newark, Ohio